Eurymerodesmus is a genus of flat-backed millipedes in the family Eurymerodesmidae. There are more than 30 described species in Eurymerodesmus.

Species
These 39 species belong to the genus Eurymerodesmus:

 Eurymerodesmus amplus Causey, 1952
 Eurymerodesmus angularis Causey, 1951
 Eurymerodesmus bentonus Causey, 1950
 Eurymerodesmus birdi Chamberlin, 1931
 Eurymerodesmus booneus Chamberlin, 1942
 Eurymerodesmus caesariatus Shelley, 1989
 Eurymerodesmus christianus Chamberlin, 1946
 Eurymerodesmus clavatus Shelley, 1989
 Eurymerodesmus compressus Causey, 1952
 Eurymerodesmus crassatus Shelley, 1989
 Eurymerodesmus creolus Chamberlin, 1942
 Eurymerodesmus dactylocyphus Shelley, 1990
 Eurymerodesmus dactylophorus Shelley, 1989
 Eurymerodesmus digitatus Loomis, 1976
 Eurymerodesmus dubius Chamberlin, 1943
 Eurymerodesmus elevatus Shelley, 1989
 Eurymerodesmus goodi Causey, 1952
 Eurymerodesmus hamatilis Loomis, 1969
 Eurymerodesmus hispidipes (Wood, 1864)
 Eurymerodesmus impurus (Wood, 1867)
 Eurymerodesmus louisianae Chamberlin, 1942
 Eurymerodesmus melacis Chamberlin & Mulaik, 1941
 Eurymerodesmus minimus Loomis, 1943
 Eurymerodesmus mundus Chamberlin, 1931
 Eurymerodesmus newtonus Chamberlin, 1942
 Eurymerodesmus oliphantus Chamberlin, 1942
 Eurymerodesmus pariocus (Chamberlin, 1942)
 Eurymerodesmus paroicus (Chamberlin, 1942)
 Eurymerodesmus planus Causey, 1950
 Eurymerodesmus plishneri Causey, 1950
 Eurymerodesmus polkensis (Causey, 1952)
 Eurymerodesmus pulaski (Causey, 1950)
 Eurymerodesmus sanbernardiensis Causey, 1952
 Eurymerodesmus schmidti Chamberlin, 1943
 Eurymerodesmus serratus Shelley, 1989
 Eurymerodesmus simplex Chamberlin, 1920
 Eurymerodesmus spectabilis Causey, 1950
 Eurymerodesmus varius (McNeill, 1887)
 Eurymerodesmus wellesleybentoni Causey, 1952

References

Further reading

 
 

Polydesmida
Articles created by Qbugbot